"Bucked Off" is a song recorded by American country music artist Brad Paisley. It was released on November 12, 2018 by Arista Nashville as the first single from his upcoming twelfth studio album. Paisley co-wrote the song with Kelley Lovelace and Chris DuBois, and co-produced it with Dann Huff.

Content
Jon Freeman of Rolling Stone wrote that the song is "an upbeat meditation on the emotional risks of dating and relationships. Paisley makes the comparison that putting oneself in that vulnerable situation feels like riding a bull at the rodeo, with its various attendant risks." The song also makes lyrical references to George Strait, name-dropping his songs "Marina del Rey" and "I Can Still Make Cheyenne".

For the song's music video, Paisley incorporated footage of himself performing the song at Tootsie's Orchid Lounge along with clips of various humorous breakups and original content submitted by fans.

Charts

References

2018 songs
2018 singles
Brad Paisley songs
Arista Nashville singles
Songs written by Brad Paisley
Songs written by Kelley Lovelace
Songs written by Chris DuBois
Song recordings produced by Dann Huff